Northeastern Huskies baseball is the varsity intercollegiate team representing Northeastern University in the sport of college baseball at the Division I level of the National Collegiate Athletic Association (NCAA). The team is led by Mike Glavine, and plays its home games at Parsons Field just off campus in Brookline, Massachusetts. The Huskies are members of the Colonial Athletic Association, which they joined in 2006.

Season-by-season records

References

 
Sports in Brookline, Massachusetts